The Lanesfield School is a historic limestone one-room school in Edgerton, Kansas that operated as a school from 1869 to 1963. The school is an example of the one-room schoolhouses that served much of rural America during the nineteenth century, and it is the only remaining structure from the former town of Lanesfield, which served as a mail stop along the Pony Express and Santa Fe Trail. The school was converted into a museum in 1967. The school is located on the Lanesfield Historic Site that includes the schoolhouse, four outbuildings, and a modern visitors center.

References

Defunct schools in Kansas
School buildings on the National Register of Historic Places in Kansas
School buildings completed in 1869
Buildings and structures in Johnson County, Kansas
National Register of Historic Places in Johnson County, Kansas
1869 establishments in Kansas
Museums_in_Johnson_County,_Kansas